Piero "Pierino" Gros (born 30 October 1954) is a former World Cup alpine ski racer from northwestern Italy. He won the gold medal in slalom at the 1976 Winter Olympics in Innsbruck, and was the World Cup overall champion in 1974.

Biography
Gros was born at Sauze d'Oulx, in the province of Turin in the Piedmont region. He learned to ski at an early age, thanks to Aldo Monaci and Aldo Zulian. At the age of 8, he was for the first time on the podium of local race. Gros made his debut in the World Cup at age 18 in December 1972. In that 1973 season, he won two races in Val d'Isère and Madonna di Campiglio; he was the youngest Italian skier ever to win a World Cup race. Two years later he won the overall title, sharing this result in Italy only with his friend and rival Gustav Thöni and with Alberto Tomba. Thöni had won the overall title the three preceding seasons and would reclaim it in 1975; he was the runner-up in 1974, and if not for Gros, would've won an unthinkable five consecutive overall titles. Gros also won the bronze medal in the giant slalom at the 1974 World Championships in St. Moritz.

His most notable and best result was the gold medal in the slalom at the 1976 Winter Olympics: he preceded the silver medalist Thöni, in the most successful race ever for Italy at the Winter Olympics. According to Gros, that race was also significant in which he defeated the then almost unbeatable Ingemar Stenmark of Sweden, to which Gros had been second for six times in that 1976 World Cup season.  Gros won another world championship medal in 1978, taking silver in slalom.  Stenmark's dominance was the major factor in Gros' limited success in the late 1970s.

During his career, Piero Gros won a total of 12 World Cup races; 7 in giant slalom and 5 in slalom. He had 35 World Cup podiums (top 3) and 98 top ten finishes. Gros retired from international competition following the 1982 season, at the age of 27.

In 1985–1990 he was mayor of his native village of Sauze d'Oulx. In the meantime he worked as sport commentator for various television stations, including RAI, the Italian State Network. He held various executive positions at the 1997 World Championships in Sestriere and was involved with the 2006 Winter Olympics as head of the volunteers and deputy mayor of the Olympic Village in Sestriere. He carried the Olympic torch at the Opening Ceremony.

His son Giorgio (b. 1981) is also a former alpine ski racer; he raced on the European Cup circuit until 2006 and competed in over twenty  World Cup speed events.

World Cup results

Season standings

Season titles

Individual races
 12 wins – (7 GS, 5 SL)
 35 podiums – (16 GS, 17, 2 K)

References

External links
 

1954 births
Living people
People from Sauze d'Oulx
Italian male alpine skiers
Alpine skiers at the 1976 Winter Olympics
Alpine skiers at the 1980 Winter Olympics
Olympic alpine skiers of Italy
Olympic gold medalists for Italy
Olympic medalists in alpine skiing
FIS Alpine Ski World Cup champions
Alpine skiers of Fiamme Gialle
Medalists at the 1976 Winter Olympics
Sportspeople from the Metropolitan City of Turin
Sauze d'Oulx